PRCS  may refer to:
Powell river Christian school 
Pasir Ris Crest Secondary
President, Royal College of Surgeons
 Primary Reaction Control System (NASA Orbiter -Shuttle Program)
Palestine Red Crescent Society